Sean Tyas (born November 8, 1979), is an American DJ and electronic music producer based in Switzerland. His productions and DJ sets are mainly based upon trance music.

Career 
Sean Tyas was born in Massapequa Park, New York in 1979.

He began his music career in 2006, after Dutch trance/electro house DJ, Sander van Doorn, selected him as the winner of the "Punk'd" remix contest. Shortly after releasing his debut single and first #1 record "Lift", Mixmag & Beatport named him "Best New DJ" and "One To Watch," marking the beginning of Tyas' journey to becoming one of the most celebrated names in trance music.

Throughout his 10-year career, he racked up a multitude of landmark achievements, including a much-lauded BBC Radio 1 Essential Mix to his credit.

His musical output includes five mix compilations albums and an impressive amount of #1 hits, such as his unforgettable remix of Dash Berlin and Emma Hewitt's "Waiting," and his groundbreaking single "Seven Weeks," which spent an astounding 12 weeks at #1. Tyas is often known for turning a great track into a monster hit of 'titanic' proportions, his remix credits include reworks for early Tiësto, Above & Beyond, Dash Berlin, Lange, Gareth Emery, and a co-production (Intricacy) with Armin van Buuren as well as others.

Tyas' 5 recent consecutive high rankings within the highly coveted DJ Mag Top 100 poll are a result of his dynamic DJ performances at some of the largest clubs and festivals in the world, including Tomorrowland, A State Of Trance, Ultra Music Festival, Electric Daisy Carnival, Electric Zoo, Godskitchen, Gatecrasher, Ministry Of Sound, Beyond Wonderland, Avalon Hollywood, Privilege Ibiza, and many more.

In 2013, Tyas released his two singles since 2011, "Lose My Logic" and "Now You See." The latter reached #2 yet dominated the Top 5 of the Beatport trance chart for 6 consecutive weeks.

In 2014, Tyas signed a highly exclusive multi-album deal with a well-known dance music label, Black Hole Recordings. His debut LP was released on Black Hole in 2015.

In 2016, he established and owned a label called Degenerate Records, for a 3 year period.

In 2019, he established and owned a label called Regenerate Records, along with British DJ Activa.

Personal life
In Massapequa Park, Sean's interest in electronic music began in 1991 when he heard a tape containing various electronic interpretations of "O'Fortuna." From then on, he began listening to techno music. He took his first steps into music production in 2000/2001, using a software called Impulse Tracker on the Microsoft DOS operating system.

In 2004, Sean moved to Germany to begin work producing for DJ Beam, followed by a move to a more appealing set-up in Switzerland, where he produced several successful singles for Dave202. Sean continues to live in Switzerland, now with his Swiss wife, Mirella.

Radio
Tyas presents an internet radio show entitled Tytanium Sessions (Rebrand of The Wednesday Whistle & Phased Out Phriday program) which airs on the first Monday of once a month on Digitally Imported's trance channel di.fm/trance. This show is also distributed via the iTunes Store in the form of a podcast.

Selected discography

Studio albums
2016 – Degeneration

Compilations 
2008 – Tytanium Volume 01
2010 – Trance Pioneers 001
2011 – Tytanium Sessions - Alpha

DJ Mixes 
2007 – Live As... Vol 4 (with John Askew)
2007 –  Techno Club Vol. 24 (with Talla 2XLC)
2008 – Trance World Volume 3
2009 – Euphoria: Trance Awards 2009 (with Simon Patterson and Claudia Cazacu)

References

External links

Sean Tyas on Black Hole Recordings
Sean Tyas on Apple Music
Sean Tyas on Beatport

American dance musicians
American expatriates in Switzerland
American trance musicians
Remixers
1979 births
Tracker musicians
Living people
Musicians from New York (state)
Black Hole Recordings artists
Electronic dance music DJs